The R509 is a Regional Route in South Africa. It connects Swartruggens with Magaliesburg via Koster and Derby.

Route
The R509 begins at a t-junction with the N4 (Platinum Highway) in the town of Swartruggens, North West (east of the town centre). It begins by going south-east for 32 kilometres to the town of Koster, where it crosses the R52 at a staggered intersection. From Koster, it continues east-south-east for 17 kilometres to the town of Derby, where it intersects with the R30. From Derby, the R509 continues eastwards for 59 kilometers to meet the northern terminus of the R500. It continues eastwards for a further 10 kilometres, crossing into Gauteng province, to reach the town of Magaliesburg, where it ends at a t-junction with the R24.

References

Regional Routes in Gauteng
Regional Routes in North West (South African province)